James Frank Koon (December 31, 1908 – January 9, 1987) was an American football and basketball coach and college athletics administrator. He served as the head football coach at the College of the Ozarks—now known as the University of the Ozarks—in Clarksville, Arkansas from 1946 to 1954 and Arkansas State Teachers College—now known as University of Central Arkansas—in Conway, Arkansas from 1955 to 1964. Koon was also the head basketball coach at Ozarks from 1947 to 1955.

Koon died on January 9, 1987, in Conway.

Head coaching record

College football

References

External links
 

1908 births
1987 deaths
Central Arkansas Bears and Sugar Bears athletic directors
Central Arkansas Bears football coaches
Henderson State Reddies football coaches
Ozarks Mountaineers football coaches
Ozarks Eagles men's basketball coaches
High school football coaches in Arkansas
Coaches of American football from Arkansas
Players of American football from Arkansas
Basketball coaches from Arkansas